Euxoa adumbrata, the sordid dart, is a moth of the family Noctuidae. The species was first described by Eduard Friedrich Eversmann in 1842. In North America it is found across northern Canada from Quebec to western Alaska, south to the northern parts of the United States, and in the mountains to Colorado. It is also found in Greenland, the coastal areas of Scandinavia and the Ural. It was recently recorded from Denmark, although this includes Euxoa lidia, which some authors regard to be a valid species.

The wingspan is 34–40 mm. Adults are on wing from June to August in North America and from July to August in northern Europe. There is one generation per year.

The larvae feed on Taraxacum and Polygonum species.

Subspecies
Euxoa adumbrata drewseni (Staudinger, 1857)
Euxoa adumbrata thanatologia (Dyar, 1904)

External links
Images
Bug Guide

Contribution to the knowledge of the fauna of Bombyces, Sphinges and Noctuidae of the Southern Ural Mountains, with description of a new Dichagyris (Lepidoptera: Lasiocampidae, Endromidae, Saturniidae, Sphingidae, Notodontidae, Noctuidae, Pantheidae, Lymantriidae, Nolidae, Arctiidae)
lepidoptera.dk

 www.schmetterlinge-deutschlands.de
Fauna Europaea

Euxoa
Moths of North America
Moths of Europe
Moths described in 1842